Cadejo is a small dark surface feature on Pluto near Voyager Terra. It is unofficially named after El Cadejo, a hellish spirit from Central American folklore which appears in the form of a large dog-like creature with burning red eyes. The feature was photographed by the New Horizons probe during the July 2015 flyby of the dwarf planet.

References

Regions of Pluto